Vahid Sarlak (born January 20, 1981) is an Iranian-German judoka. Overall he has won 18 medals – 5 gold, 6 silver and 7 bronze at different international contests. Sarlak began his Judo practice in 1994 at the age of 13 in Tehran, Iran, and earned his first silver medal at the Asian Youth Championships in 2000 in Hong Kong. Since then he  competed in Judo tournaments earning international awards.

He came close to winning the gold medal at the 2005 World Judo Championships in Cairo. However, because of the Iranian government's political issues with Israel, Sarlak was ordered by the Iranian Federation to lose to his Azerbaijani competitor to avoid competing against an Israeli opponent in the next round.

Sarlak continued to compete internationally, and in 2009, after achieving 5th place in the World Championships at Rotterdam, Netherlands, he expatriated from Iran due to the effect his country's political issues had on his career. Later he became a legal resident of the German Judo Federation and shortly thereafter joined the German Bundesliga Judo team.

Sarlak has stated in interviews that he is not politically minded but believes that political divergence or agendas should not interfere with sports or any public occasion where different cultures and nationalities connect. He is quoted as saying, "Judo is a sport in which manners and respecting the other is the first lesson. Asian, African, American, etc. are all human beings and if there are any existing issues, it should be handled when stepping on the tatemi!"

Sarlak was the head coach of Tajikistan's national judo team in 2019 World Judo Championships in Tokyo.

Sarlak now is a Hed Coach auf  refugee judo teim Paris 2024

References

External links

Living people
Iranian male judoka
1981 births
21st-century Iranian people